The Texas Motorplex is a quarter mile drag racing facility located in Ennis, Texas, United States,  south of downtown Dallas. Built in 1986 by former funny car driver Billy Meyer, the Motorplex was the first National Hot Rod Association (NHRA) "super track." It annually hosts the Texas NHRA FallNationals each October, when hundreds of professional and amateur drag racers compete for over $2 million in prize money. Past winners have included John Force, Kenny Bernstein, and Tony Schumacher.

History
The Texas Motorplex was the first all-concrete stadium-style drag racing facility ever constructed. Built in 1986, The Texas Motorplex has been the place of many drag racing milestones and world record performances. The Billy Meyer-owned facility hosts a number of racing and car show events between March and November each year and also features the Champions Club – an  facility – that serves fully catered events throughout the year.

Texas Motorplex Milestones

Nov. 1985: Billy Meyer signs an agreement to host an NHRA event the following September, before ground was broken on the facility.

Jan. 1986: Ground breaks for the Texas Motorplex – designed to be the first post tension, all-concrete, quarter-mile facility specifically created for drag racing.

Sept. 25, 1986: Darrell Gwynn runs 5.280 to set Top Fuel E.T. record with the first national event pass on the track.

April 1997: The Texas Motorplex becomes the first non-NHRA-owned track to host two national events.

1997: The Texas Motorplex opens the Divisional 4 Hall of Fame, becoming the only track to host a hall of fame.

1997: The Texas Motorplex becomes the first facility to build a permanent hospitality structure to host fans in a VIP atmosphere; originally known as The Top Eliminator Club and now known as the Champions Club.

April 9, 1988: Eddie Hill turns in the first four-second quarter mile pass – a 4.990 run.

Oct. 19, 1997: Cory McClenathan makes the first pass in the 320 mph-range – a 321.77 run.

Oct. 24, 1998: Gary Scelzi, John Force, Warren Johnson and Larry Kopp lead the quickest qualifying field in NHRA history.

Oct. 23, 1999: En route to his first, NHRA championship, Top Fuel driver Tony Schumacher earns his first national event victory.

Oct. 23, 1999: John Force clinched his ninth NHRA Funny Car championship by defeating Tommy Johnson Jr. in the quickest side-by-side race in Funny Car history.

Sept. 23, 2004: The Texas Motorplex becomes the first NHRA track in the country to have starting line balcony seating in the tower suites.

Sept. 26, 2004: Greg Anderson clinches his second consecutive NHRA Pro Stock title at the Texas Motorplex. Anderson clinched the title faster than any other driver in NHRA history.

Current Track Records

Top Fuel: 3.784 seconds by Brandon Bernstein (Sept. 2010);  by Spencer Massey (Sept. 2011).

Funny Car: 4.062 seconds by Matt Hagan (Sept. 2010);  by Jack Beckman (Sept. 2011).

Pro Stock: 6.553 seconds by Jason Line (Sept. 2011);  by Jason Line (Sept. 2011).

Pro Stock Motorcycle: 6.774 seconds, 202.55 mph. Matt Smith, October 9, 2021.

NHRA #FallNats #NHRApsm

External links 
 
 Texas Motorplex

NHRA Division 4 drag racing venues
Motorsport venues in Texas
Buildings and structures in Ellis County, Texas
Tourist attractions in Ellis County, Texas